John Alfred Lush (21 March 1815 – 4 August 1888) was an English Liberal politician who sat in the House of Commons from 1868 to 1880.

Lush was the son of John Lush of Berwick St John, Wiltshire and his wife Martha Kelleway daughter of James Kelleway of Donhead, Wiltshire. He was an MD of St Andrews University and became a general medical practitioner at Salisbury. He was a member of the Royal College of Physicians of London and one of the proprietors of the Fisherton House Lunatic Asylum. He was a J.P. and an Alderman of Salisbury, of which city he was Mayor for 1866–67.
 
At the 1868 general election Lush was elected Member of Parliament for Salisbury. He held the seat until 1880.

Lush died at the age of 73. He had married Sarah Martha Finch daughter of W. C. Finch MD of Fisherton House, Salisbury, Wiltshire in May 1853.

References

External links
 

1815 births
1888 deaths
Liberal Party (UK) MPs for English constituencies
UK MPs 1868–1874
UK MPs 1874–1880
Mayors of Salisbury
Alumni of the University of St Andrews
Politics of Salisbury
People involved with mental health